USS Dunn County (LST-742) was an  built for the United States Navy during World War II. Named after counties in North Dakota and Wisconsin, she was the only U.S. Naval vessel to bear the name.

LST-742 was laid down on 12 March 1944 at Pittsburgh, Pennsylvania by the Dravo Corporation of Neville Island; launched on 22 April 1944; sponsored by Mrs. Harry Lester; and commissioned on 23 May 1944.

Service history
During World War II, LST-742 was assigned to the Asiatic-Pacific theater and participated in the following operations: the Lingayen Gulf landing (January 1945), Visayan Island landings (March - April 1945) and the Tarakan Island operation (April - May 1945).

Following the war, LST-742 was decommissioned on 26 April 1946 and transferred to the United States Army on 28 June 1946 to serve as USAT LST-742. She was returned to the United States Navy and recommissioned on 1 September 1950. On 1 July 1955 she was redesignated USS Dunn County (LST-742). The ship performed service during the Korean War followed by extensive service with Amphibious Force, U.S. Pacific Fleet, until decommissioned and struck from the Naval Vessel Register on 1 February 1961. Dunn County was sold to Zidell Explorations, Inc. of Portland, Oregon on 6 September 1961 for scrapping.
 
LST-742 earned three battle stars for World War II service and five battle stars for the Korean War.

References

See also

 Dunn County, North Dakota
 Dunn County, Wisconsin

LST-542-class tank landing ships
World War II amphibious warfare vessels of the United States
Cold War amphibious warfare vessels of the United States
Korean War amphibious warfare vessels of the United States
Ships built in Pittsburgh
Dunn County, North Dakota
Dunn County, Wisconsin
1944 ships
Ships built by Dravo Corporation